The Porto Novo Cup is a regional football (soccer) cup competition played during the season in the southern and westernmost parts of Santo Antão Island, Cape Verde. The winner participates in the Cape Verdean Cup. The cup tournament is organized by the Santo Antão South Regional Football Association (Associação Regional de Futebol de Zona Sul do Santo Antão, ARFZSSA). The first entrant was in 2007. Since 2013, there were no entrants to the national cup due to financial concerns. From the 2015 edition, the winner qualifies into the Santo Antão Cup, a single island cup competition challenging a club from the north.

Académica Porto Novo won their 11th and recent regional cup title which was also their sixth consecutive

The upcoming super cup edition will feature Académica Porto Novo and Marítimo, Académica will qualify as champions, also being cup winner, Marítimo will qualify as runner up in the cup final

Winners

Club performance

See also
Santo Antão Cup and Super Cup
Santo Antão Island League (South)
Porto Novo Super Cup

References

External links
Porto Novo Cup at the FCF's Santo Antão Island League (North) page 

Sport in Santo Antão, Cape Verde
Porto Novo Municipality
Football cup competitions in Cape Verde
1997 establishments in Cape Verde
Recurring sporting events established in 1997